Maxim Aleksandrovich Usanov (born 5 March 1985) is a Russian former footballer.

Career
Usanov began his career for FC Zenit Saint Petersburg, playing one game in the Russian Premier League Cup. He played with Latvian clubs FK Riga and Skonto FC, signing with the team on three occasions. Usanov has also played for PFC Spartak Nalchik in the Russian Premier League and FC Alania Vladikavkaz in the Russian First Division. He last played with Russian club FC Krasnodar before signing with Toronto FC on April 12, 2010. He made his debut for Toronto FC against the Philadelphia Union on April 15, 2010. After making 21 appearances in all competitions in the 2010 season with Toronto, he was released by the club on November 24, 2010.

Honours

Toronto FC
Canadian Championship (1): 2010

References

External links

1985 births
Living people
Russian footballers
Skonto FC players
Russian expatriate sportspeople in Latvia
Russian expatriate footballers
Expatriate footballers in Latvia
FC Zenit Saint Petersburg players
PFC Spartak Nalchik players
Russian expatriate sportspeople in Canada
FC Spartak Vladikavkaz players
Russian Premier League players
Toronto FC players
Expatriate soccer players in Canada
FC Krasnodar players
Major League Soccer players
FC Petrotrest players
Expatriate footballers in Armenia
FC Urartu players
Association football defenders